Edward Ewart Whitley (1825 – 14 January 1892) was an English solicitor and  Conservative politician who sat in the House of Commons from 1880 to 1892.

Biography
Whitley was the son of John Whitley of Liverpool and his wife Isabella Greenall,
and a nephew of the Conservative politician Gilbert Greenall.
He was educated at Rugby School and  admitted a solicitor in 1849. He became a senior partner in the legal firm  of Whitley, Maddock, Hampson, & Castle, of Liverpool.
He became a member of the Corporation of Liverpool in 1866, and was Mayor of Liverpool in 1868. He became a J. P.  for Liverpool.

In 1880 Whitley was elected as one of three Members of Parliament (MPs) for Liverpool and held the seat until the Redistribution of Seats Act 1885. He was then elected MP for Everton, which he held until his death aged 66. He was buried in Alvanley Churchyard, near Helsby in Cheshire.

In 1878 Whitley married Elizabeth Eleanor Walker. His residences were The Grange, Halewood, near Liverpool and 185  Piccadilly.

Whitley is commemorated by Whitley Street in Liverpool, and by a triangular piece of rocky ground in Everton called Whitley Gardens.

There is a statue of Edward Whitley in St George's Hall, Liverpool.

References

External links 
 

1825 births
1892 deaths
People educated at Rugby School
Conservative Party (UK) MPs for English constituencies
UK MPs 1885–1886
UK MPs 1886–1892
Mayors of Liverpool
Members of the Parliament of the United Kingdom for Liverpool